The 1937–38 Connecticut State Huskies men's basketball team represented Connecticut State College, now the University of Connecticut, in the 1937–38 collegiate men's basketball season. The Huskies completed the season with a 13–5 overall record. The Huskies were members of the New England Conference, where they ended the season with a 4–4 record. The Huskies played their home games at Hawley Armory in Storrs, Connecticut, and were led by second-year head coach Don White.

Schedule 

|-
!colspan=12 style=""| Regular Season

Schedule Source:

References 

UConn Huskies men's basketball seasons
Connecticut
1937 in sports in Connecticut
1938 in sports in Connecticut